David Castilla (born 6 July 1977) is a retired French football goalkeeper.

He played for OGC Nice, FC Nantes, Ayr United F.C. and not France Under 21s (44 league games and eight cup games), US Créteil and AS Beauvais.

References

1977 births
Living people
Association football goalkeepers
French footballers
OGC Nice players
FC Nantes players
Ayr United F.C. players
US Créteil-Lusitanos players
AS Beauvais Oise players
Ligue 1 players
Ligue 2 players